Silver phosphate or silver orthophosphate is a light sensitive, yellow, water-insoluble chemical compound composed of silver and phosphate ions of formula Ag3PO4.

Synthesis, reactions and properties 
Silver phosphate is formed as a yellow solid precipitate by the reaction between a soluble silver salt, such as silver nitrate, with a soluble orthophosphate. Its solubility product is 8.89×10−17 mol4·dm−2. The precipitation reaction is analytically significant and can be used in qualitative or quantitative and quantitative analysis.

This compound dissolves in aqueous ammonia. Large crystals of silver phosphate form upon gradual evaporation of such ammoniacal solutions.

Its structure has been confirmed by X-ray crystallography.

Uses 
The precipitation of silver phosphate is useful in traditional analytical chemistry.  Precipitation of silver phosphate is also used in silver staining of biological materials (after reduction to silver metal) - as a magnifying agent for phosphate.

Silver phosphate also found use in early photography as a light sensitive agent.

Silver phosphate exhibits antibacterial properties.

Research
Silver phosphate is a high (90%) quantum yield photocatalyst for the visible light photochemical splitting of water and for production of activated oxygen by the same method.

Other silver phosphates 
Silver pyrophosphate Ag4P2O7 (CAS No. 13465-97-9) can be prepared as a white precipitate from reaction of silver(I) and pyrophosphate ions. Like silver orthophosphate it is light sensitive. Silver orthophosphate turns red on exposure to light. It has a density of 5.306 g/cm3 and a melting point of 585 °C. A hydrate also exists which decomposes at 110 °C.

Silver metaphosphate (AgPO3) (CAS No. 13465-96-8) is a white solid with a density of 6.370 g/cm3 and a melting point of 482 °C. A hydrate also exists which decomposes at 240 °C.

References 

Silver compounds
Phosphates